Darryl Eric Morris (born September 4, 1990) is an American football cornerback who is currently a free agent. He played college football for Texas State. He was signed by the San Francisco 49ers as an undrafted free agent in 2013.

Professional career

San Francisco 49ers
On May 2, 2013, he signed with the San Francisco 49ers as an undrafted free agent. On August 31, 2013, he was released. On September 3, 2013, he was signed to the practice squad. On September 24, 2013, he was promoted to the active roster from the practice squad.

Houston Texans
On August 31, 2014, Morris was claimed off waivers by the Houston Texans.

New York Jets
Morris signed with the New York Jets in March 2016. On September 3, 2016, he was released by the Jets as part of final roster cuts.

Indianapolis Colts
On September 5, 2016, Morris signed with the Colts. He was released by the Colts on October 19, 2016. He was re-signed by the Colts on November 23, 2016.

On August 21, 2017, Morris was placed on injured reserve. He was released on October 3, 2017.

New York Giants
On November 28, 2017, Morris signed with the New York Giants.

San Antonio Commanders (AAF)
In December 2018, Morris signed with the San Antonio Commanders of the AAF. On January 30, 2019, Morris was waived/injured by the Commanders as part of the final training camp cuts, and subsequently placed on injured reserve after clearing waivers. The league ceased operations in April 2019.

References

External links
Texas State bio
San Francisco 49ers bio

1990 births
Living people
Players of American football from San Antonio
American football cornerbacks
Texas State Bobcats football players
San Francisco 49ers players
Houston Texans players
New York Jets players
Indianapolis Colts players
New York Giants players
San Antonio Commanders players